Cramer  is an English surname and the Anglicized version of Dutch and Low German Kramer, or German Krämer (pronounced ). Both refer to the profession of traveling merchants in the Late Middle Ages. The meaning later changed to "merchants trading with different, rather small things.

Notable people with the name include:

People
 Anthony Cramer, appellant in Cramer v. United States (U.S. Supreme Court, 1945)
 Carl Eduard Cramer (1831–1901), Swiss botanist
 Casey Cramer (born 1982), American football player
 Chris Cramer (1948–2021), British news journalist and executive
 Christopher J. Cramer (born 1961), American chemist
 Clayton Cramer, American historian and software engineer
 Daniel Cramer (1568–1637), German Lutheran theologian
 Doc Cramer (1905–1990), American baseball player
 Dorothy Cramer, American baseball player
 Douglas S. Cramer, American TV producer
 Dylan Cramer (born 1958), Canadian jazz musician
 Ernst Cramer (architect) (1898–1980), Swiss landscape architect
 Ernst J. Cramer (1913–2010), American journalist
 Ernst Cramer (politician) (1960), Dutch politician
 Floyd Cramer (1933–1997), American pianist
 Franz Cramer (violinist) (1772–1848), English violinist and Master of the Queen's Music
 Gabe Cramer (born 1994), Israeli-Canadian-American baseball player
 Gabriel Cramer (1704–1752), Swiss mathematician, discoverer of Cramer's rule
 Cramer brothers, Gabriel and Philibert Cramer, 18th century Swiss publishers
 Grant Cramer (born 1951), American actor
 Hank Cramer (born 1953), American folk singer
 Hans Cramer (1896–1968), German general
 Harald Cramér (1893–1985), Swedish mathematician
 Harriet L. Cramer (1847-1922), American newspaper publisher
 Helene Cramer (1844–1916), German painter
 Jacqueline Cramer (born 1951), Dutch politician
 Jayme Cramer (born 1983), American swimmer
 Jim Cramer (born 1955), American investment manager and television personality
 Joey Cramer (born 1973), Canadian child actor
 Johann Baptist Cramer (1771–1858), German pianist and composer
 John Cramer (announcer), American television announcer
 John Cramer (Australian politician) (1896–1994)
 John Cramer (representative) (1779–1870), American politician from New York
 John Antony Cramer (1793–1848), English classical scholar and geographer
 John G. Cramer (born 1934), American physicist and science fiction author
 Johann Ulrich von Cramer (1706–1772), German judge, legal scholar, and philosopher
 Karl von Cramer (1818–1902), Bavarian politician
 Kathryn Cramer (born 1962), American science fiction author and editor
 Kevin Cramer (born 1961), American politician from North Dakota
 Lawrence William Cramer (1897–1978), Governor of the United States Virgin Islands
 Lea-Sophie Cramer (born 1987), German entrepreneur
 Mars Cramer (born 1928), Dutch economist
 Michael Cramer (actor) (1930–2000), German actor
 Michael Cramer (politician) (born 1949), German politician
 Molly Cramer (1852–1936), German painter
 Morten Cramer (born 1967), Danish football player
 Patrick Cramer (born 1969), German biochemist
 Peggy Cramer (1937–2016), American baseball player
 Philippe Cramer (born 1970), Swiss furniture and wallpaper designer
 Philo Cramer, American guitarist
 Pieter Cramer (1721–1776), Dutch wool merchant and entomologist
 Richard Cramer (1889–1960), American actor
 Richard Ben Cramer (1950–2013), American journalist and author
 Rie Cramer (1887–1977), Dutch writer and illustrator
 Robert E. Cramer (born 1947), American politician from Alabama
 Ronald Cramer (born 1968), Dutch cryptographer
 Ronnie Cramer (1957–2021), American artist, composer and filmmaker
 Walter Cramer (1886–1944), German businessman and anti-Hitler conspirator
 Wilhelm Cramer (1746–1799), German-British violinist, best known for the "Cramer bow"
 William Cramer (pathologist) (1878–1945), German-born pathologist
 William C. Cramer (1922–2003), American politician from Florida

In fiction
 Cramer family, characters on the U.S. soap opera One Life to Live
 Inspector Cramer, recurring character in the Nero Wolfe detective stories
 Jason Cramer, character on the HBO drama Oz
 Nurse Cramer, character in Catch-22 by Joseph Heller

See also
Cremer, surname
Kramer (surname)

Occupational surnames